The Breithorn, (3,780 m) is a mountain of the Bernese Alps, located on the border between the Swiss cantons of Bern and Valais. It is part of the border between  Lauterbrunnental and the Lötschental. It lies approximately halfway between the Tschingelhorn and the Grosshorn.

The Breithorn is one of two mountains named Breithorn overlooking the Lötschental, the other being the Breithorn (Blatten).

See also
List of mountains of Switzerland

References

External links

 Lauterbrunnen Breithorn on Hikr

Mountains of the Alps
Bernese Alps
Alpine three-thousanders
Mountains of Switzerland
Mountains of Valais
Mountains of the canton of Bern
Bern–Valais border